Gopi Chandra Parki (born 7 July 1989) is a Nepalese long-distance runner. He won a gold medal in the 13th South Asian Games. He is a member of the Armed Police Force of Nepal.

Parki was initially selected to represent Nepal in the marathon at the 2020 Tokyo Olympics via the universality rule but was not included on the final team.

References

1989 births
Living people
Athletes (track and field) at the 2018 Asian Games
Athletes (track and field) at the 2014 Asian Games
Asian Games competitors for Nepal
Nepalese marathon runners
Nepalese male long-distance runners
21st-century Nepalese people